This is a list of seasons completed by the Northwestern State Demons football team of the National Collegiate Athletic Association (NCAA) Division I Football Championship Subdivision (FCS). Northwestern State's first football team was fielded in 1907.

Northwestern State originally competed as a football independent, before going on to compete on the Louisiana Intercollegiate Athletic Association, Southern Intercollegiate Athletic Association, Louisiana Intercollegiate Conference, Gulf States Conference, Gulf South Conference, and Gulf Star Conference. Since 1987, Northwestern State has been a member of the I-AA's Southland Conference.

Seasons
Statistics correct as of the end of the 2021-22 college football season

References

Northwestern State

Northwestern State Demons football seasons